In mathematics, a generating set Γ of a module M over a ring R is a subset of M such that the smallest submodule of M containing Γ is M itself (the smallest submodule containing a subset is the intersection of all submodules containing the set). The set Γ is then said to generate M. For example, the ring R is generated by the identity element 1 as a left R-module over itself. If there is a finite generating set, then a module is said to be finitely generated.

This applies to ideals, which are the submodules of the ring itself. In particular, a principal ideal is an ideal that has a generating set consisting of a single element.

Explicitly, if Γ is a generating set of a module M, then every element of M is a (finite) R-linear combination of some elements of Γ; i.e., for each x in M, there are r1, ..., rm in R and g1, ..., gm in Γ such that

 

Put in another way, there is a surjection

 

where we wrote rg for an element in the g-th component of the direct sum. (Coincidentally, since a generating set always exists, e.g. M itself, this shows that a module is a quotient of a free module, a useful fact.)

A generating set of a module is said to be minimal if no proper subset of the set generates the module. If R is a field, then a minimal generating set is the same thing as a basis. Unless the module is finitely generated, there may exist no minimal generating set.

The cardinality of a minimal generating set need not be an invariant of the module; Z is generated as a principal ideal by 1, but it is also generated by, say, a minimal generating set }. What is uniquely determined by a module is the infimum of the numbers of the generators of the module.

Let R be a local ring with maximal ideal m and residue field k and M finitely generated module. If M is flat, then this minimal generating set is linearly independent (so M is free). See also: Minimal resolution.

A more refined information is obtained if one considers the relations between the generators; see Free presentation of a module.

See also 
Countably generated module
Flat module
Invariant basis number

References 

Dummit, David; Foote, Richard. Abstract Algebra.

Abstract algebra